The Robești is a right tributary of the river Olt in Romania. It flows into the Olt in the village Robești.

References

Rivers of Romania
Rivers of Vâlcea County